Santokh (pronunciation: , meaning contentment) is one of five virtues that is vigorously promoted by the Sikh Gurus. The other four qualities in the arsenal are: "Truth" (Sat), "Compassion" (Daya), "Humility" (Nimrata) and "Love" (Pyare). These five qualities are essential to a Sikh and it is their duty to meditate and recite the Gurbani so that these virtues become a part of their mind.

Contentment is another very important virtue in Sikhism. Instead of constantly thinking of how to satisfy personal desires, Sikhs try to accept the circumstances of their lives and concentrate on acting in accordance with God’s Will (Hukam). They try to remember that all aspects of life are a result of God’s Will. Contentment leads to freedom from care, fear and worry. It is a very important divine quality; it is a deep godly "priceless jewel", which is acquired by those souls who move on the path of Sach Khand.

When all the desires vanish the state of contentment is reached, the state of  "Sat Santokh" is acquired. Desires are the reason for our sorrows and pains; it is a search for an escape from these sorrows and pains. In fulfilling desires the person gets momentary happiness; unfulfilled desires bring disappointment. A continuous string of disappointments leads to depression and to mental and physical sicknesses.

Desires lead to mental and physical distortion of the mind; whereas contentment brings peace and calmness to the mind. This state of calmness and fulfilment brings us closer to the Almighty, because where there is complete peace in the mental state of the person, the mind can focus on the ultimate reality, the Akal Purakh.

Gurbani 
  Dharma (religion) is the son of compassion; 
Dhoul Dharam da-i-aa kaa poot. 

Contentment patiently holds the earth in its place. 
santokh thaap rakhi-aa jin soot. (Guru Granth Sahib, page 3, line 73)

 Practice truth, contentment and kindness; this is the most excellent way of life.
sat santokh da-i-aa kamaavai ayh karnee saar. (Guru Granth Sahib, page 51, line 2072)

 Truth, contentment and intuitive peace and poise are obtained from the Bani, the Word of the Perfect Guru. ((3))
sach santokh sahj sukh banee pooray gur tay paavni-aa. ((3)) (Guru Granth Sahib, page 115, line 4670)

References
 Sri Guru Granth Sahib

Sikh terminology